Jesús Manuel Medina Maldonado (born 30 April 1997) is a Paraguayan professional footballer who plays for Russian club CSKA Moscow and the Paraguay national team.

Club career 
Medina made his senior debut as a 15-year-old for Libertad on 7 July 2012 in a 1-0 win over Club Rubio Ñu.

On 31 December 2017, it was announced that Medina was signing with Major League Soccer side New York City FC ahead of their 2018 season. Following the 2021 season and a disappointing four year stretch with the club, New York City opted to decline their contract option on Medina.

On 17 January 2022, he signed a contract with Russian Premier League club CSKA Moscow until the end of the 2024–25 season.

International career

Paraguay U17 and U20
Medina was part of the Paraguay U17 squad for the 2013 South American Under-17 Football Championship, scoring four times as the team finished fifth.

He was also named to the Paraguay U20 squad for the 2015 and 2017 South American Youth Football Championships (CONMEBOL U-20 Championship). In the 2015 tournament, he scored a goal in a 4–2 win over Bolivia U20 in the group stage, and in the 2017 tournament he scored twice in a 3–2 group stage loss to Brazil U20.

Paraguay
He was named in the senior team's provisional squad for Copa América Centenario, but was cut from the final squad. On 1 July 2017, Medina made his debut for Paraguay in a friendly match against Mexico, coming in as a substitute in the 85th minute.

Personal life
In February 2019, Medina earned a U.S. green card which qualifies him as a domestic player for MLS roster purposes.

Career statistics

Club

International

Honours
New York City FC
 MLS Cup: 2021

See also
 Players and Records in Paraguayan Football

References

External links
 
 

1997 births
Sportspeople from Asunción
Living people
Paraguayan footballers
Paraguay under-20 international footballers
Association football wingers
Club Libertad footballers
New York City FC players
PFC CSKA Moscow players
Designated Players (MLS)
Major League Soccer players
Paraguayan Primera División players
Russian Premier League players
2015 South American Youth Football Championship players
Paraguayan expatriate footballers
Expatriate soccer players in the United States
Paraguayan expatriate sportspeople in the United States
Expatriate footballers in Russia
Paraguayan expatriate sportspeople in Russia
Paraguay international footballers